Cyperus filiculmis is a species of sedge that is native to southern parts of North America.

The species was first formally described by the botanist Martin Vahl in 1805.

See also 
 List of Cyperus species

References 

filiculmis
Taxa named by Martin Vahl
Plants described in 1805
Flora of Alabama
Flora of Delaware
Flora of Florida
Flora of Georgia (U.S. state)
Flora of Louisiana
Flora of Maryland
Flora of Mississippi
Flora of North Carolina
Flora of South Carolina
Flora of Texas
Flora of Virginia